This is a list of defunct airlines of the Dominican Republic.

See also
 List of airlines of the Dominican Republic
 List of airports in the Dominican Republic

References

Dominican Republic
Airlines
Airlines, defunct